In molecular biology, the hyccin protein family is a family of proteins which may have a role in the beta-catenin-Tcf/Lef signaling pathway, as well as in the process of myelination of the central and peripheral nervous system. One member of this family is hyccin, encoded by the FAM126A gene. Defects in Hyccin are the cause of Hypomyelination and Congenital Cataract (HCC), also called leukodystrophy hypomyelinating type 5 (HLD5). This disorder is characterised by congenital cataracts, progressive neurologic impairment, and diffuse myelin deficiency. Affected individuals experience progressive pyramidal and cerebellar dysfunction, muscle weakness and wasting prevailing in the lower limbs.

References

External links
   GeneReviews/NCBI/NIH/UW entry on Hypomyelination and Congenital Cataract

Protein families